Stop the Bleeding may refer to:

 Stop the Bleeding (Tourniquet album), 1990
 Stop the Bleeding (Sponge album), 2013
 Stop the Bleeding, the season 13 premiere of NCIS